Leptocypris crossensis is a species of cyprinid fish found in the Cross, Wouri and Sanaga River basins in Cameroon and Nigeria.

References

Leptocypris
Danios
Fish of Africa
Fish described in 1989